James Rashaan Gayle (born February 15, 1991) is a retired American football outside linebacker. He played college football at Virginia Tech. He signed with the Tennessee Titans as an undrafted free agent in 2014.

High school
Gayle attended Bethel High School in Hampton, Virginia. A second-team All-Peninsula District member as a defensive end, he recorded 96 tackles (60 solo) and 12 sacks as a defensive end his senior season, and registered 56 solo tackles and 10 sacks as a junior.

Considered a three-star recruit by Rivals.com, he was rated the 25th best strongside defensive end in the nation. He accepted a scholarship offer from Virginia Tech over offers from East Carolina, NC State, Purdue, Syracuse and UCF.

College career
In 2009, Gayle redshirted as a freshman. In 2010, he started two games while playing in all 14 games. He totaled 13 tackles, including 6.5 for loss, four sacks and twelve quarterback hurries. In 2011, he garnered second-team All-ACC honors after recording 38 tackles, including 12.5 for loss, seven sacks, along with 20 quarterback hurries on the season. In 2012, Gayle played in all 13 games, starting 11. He recorded 43 tackles on the season, including 11 for loss, five sacks, and 27 quarterback hurries. He earned second-team All-ACC honors for the second consecutive season. In his final season in 2013, he started all 13 games, and totaled 44 tackles, 10.5 for loss, and six sacks, and was a conference honorable mention.

For his career, he totaled 138 tackles, including 40.5 for loss, and 22 sacks.

Professional career

2014 NFL Combine

2014 NFL Draft
Gayle, who was originally projected as a fourth or fifth round pick, was not selected in the 2014 NFL Draft, despite a strong combine performance. Gayle himself said it was due to an injury he suffered from during the 2013 season. Gayle said he was upset that he fell undrafted because of his minor injury because he played with it throughout his whole Senior year. He also said it was understandable though, considering he missed the Senior Bowl with his bad shoulder.

Tennessee Titans
On May 12, 2014, it was reported Gayle signed with the Tennessee Titans as an undrafted free agent. He received shoulder surgery on June 12.

Washington Redskins
Gayle signed a futures contract with Washington on January 3, 2015. He was waived/injured on May 18. After going unclaimed by waivers, he was placed on the injured reserve list.

On June 1, 2016, Gayle was waived by Washington.

Personal life
His uncle, Shaun Gayle, is a former Pro Bowler and Super Bowl champion who played safety for the Chicago Bears.

References

External links

Virginia Tech Hokies bio

Living people
1991 births
Players of American football from Los Angeles
American football defensive ends
American football outside linebackers
Virginia Tech Hokies football players
Tennessee Titans players
Washington Redskins players
Players of American football from Virginia
Sportspeople from Hampton, Virginia